Daniele Pedrini (born October 29, 1976) is an Italian ski mountaineer.

Pedrini was born in Bormio. He is member of the Sci Club Alta Valtellina.

Selected results 
 2006:
 2nd, Trofeo Parravicini (together with Guido Giacomelli)
 3rd, Adamello Ski Raid (together with Guido Giacomelli and Graziano Boscacci and Ivan Murada)
 2007:
 1st: Gara del Pizzo Scalino (together with Graziano Boscacci)
 2nd, Sellaronda Skimarathon (together with Mirco Mezzanotte)
 2008:
 1st, Pila Race (together with Pietro Lanfranchi)
 1st, Gara Scialpinistica "Pizzo Tre Signori" (together with Pietro Lanfranchi)
 2009:
 2nd, Trofeo Besimauda
 2nd, Transclautana
 8th, European Championship team race (together with Pietro Lanfranchi)
 2010:
 5th, World Championship team race (together with Pietro Lanfranchi)
 2nd, Sellaronda Skimarathon (together with Graziano Boscacci)

Pierra Menta 

 2007: 8th, together with Ivan Murada
 2008: 10th, together with Pietro Lanfranchi
 2009: 8th, together with Pietro Lanfranchi
 2010: 6th, together with Pietro Lanfranchi

Trofeo Mezzalama 

 2007: 6th, together with Lorenzo Holzknecht and Mattia Coletti
 2009: 2nd, together with Jean Pellissier and Damiano Lenzi
 2011: 2nd, together with Pietro Lanfranchi and Alain Seletto

References

External links 
 Daniele Pedrini at skimountaineering.org

1976 births
Living people
Italian male ski mountaineers
People from Sondrio
Sportspeople from the Province of Sondrio